The Turkish Baths was a Victorian Turkish bath on Lincoln Place, Dublin.

History
The Turkish Baths on Lincoln Place, Dublin opened on 2 February 1860 having been built by Richard Barter as part of the Turkish Bath Company of Dublin Ltd. The main frontage was 186 feet long. The Bath attendants wore red dressing gowns and Turkish slippers, and served coffee and "chibouk" to the patrons. Initially very successful, the Baths served 90 bathers a day for the first 4 years of operation.

There was an adjoining restaurant which was leased out to a number of proprietors, the first of which was the Café de Paris, and while it was run by Muret & Olin it has been speculated that it was the first documented French restaurant in Dublin.

Barter left the business by 1867, and later opened a baths known as The Hammam on O'Connell Street on 17 March 1869. The Baths at Lincoln Place were subsequently refurbished in 1867, and again in 1875 in two phases. The works in 1875 saw the installation of modern showers and a plunge bath. With competition from The Hammam and new baths on St Stephen's Green, the Turkish Baths went into liquidation in 1880 and went up for sale. They were purchased by the owners of the St Stephen's Green baths, Millar and Jury, and were modernised further. After a series of events including a court case for negligence, Millar and Jury sold the baths.

The Baths are mentioned in James Joyce's Ulysses, where Leopold Bloom refers to them as "the mosque of baths". Ulysses was set in 1904, and in reality the Baths had closed in 1901.

The Baths were put up for sale in 1900, and were used for a number of commercial purposes before the building was demolished in 1970.

Architecture
Designed by Richard Barter (not a relation of the bath owner), the building was well received by the Dublin Builder magazine, which praised Irish builders for executing the unusual design so well noting in particularly the elaborate plaster decoration on the facade. On either side of central ticket office were two separate bathing areas for men and women. A very prominent feature was the 50 foot high ogee-shaped dome which sat above the company board room. At the rear of the building, there was a bathing area for animals including horses. The interior featured "oriental arches and coloured bricks" and the floors were fitted with patterned tiles from Mintons.

References

Public baths
Demolished buildings and structures in Dublin
Buildings and structures in Dublin (city)
Buildings and structures demolished in 1970